Pop Carn is a 2003 Indian Tamil-language romantic drama film written and directed by Nassar. The film stars Mohanlal and Simran, and introduces newcomers Kunal Shah and Jyothi Naval. The title is short for the phrase "Pop Carnival", with a storyline focusing on why marriages between celebrities can suffer due to conflicts between egos.

Plot 

Popular music director Vikramaditya returns from a long sabbatical to work with a young music troupe and falls in love with a fusion dancer Jamuna. The two marry but fall apart due to their clashing artistic egos. Vikramaditya's daughter Megha attempts to reunite her father and mother, but fails. The rest of the movie shows how Vikramadithya and Jamuna reuniting which forms the rest of the story.

Cast 

 Mohanlal as Vikramaditya
 Simran as Jamuna
 Jyothi Naval as Megha
 Kunal Shah as Satish
 Urvashi
 Vivek
 Sriman
 Anju
 Pop Shalini
 K. Sivasankar
Vagai Chandrasekhar
Janagaraj
Delhi Ganesh
Thyagu
Madhan Bob
M. S. Viswanathan
Laxmi Ratten
Alphonsa (cameo appearance)

Production 
The film was initially set to be titled Theem Thari Kida. In July 2002 the film was reported as being "in the finishing stages." Cinematography is by Sridhar and Vikram Dharma is the stunt master.

Soundtrack 
The soundtrack was composed by Yuvan Shankar Raja and features seven tracks, the lyrics of which were written by Vaali. Although the film's lead actor, Mohanlal, was said to sing one of the songs, titled "Amme Inge Vaa", it did not feature either in the soundtrack or in the film itself.

Reception 
Director Nassar predicted that Pop-Corn would be "a big hit",  and Sify wrote that Pop-corn "is modern family drama about relationships”, expanding that  Nassar and Yuvan "created a new fusion music that’s elevated and uplifting." Malini Mannath wrote in Chennai Online, "While Nasser has been able to build up skillfully the relationship between the lead characters, the same cannot be said of his Pop Carnival scenes. Appalling are the flaws in the scripting and narration".

References

External links 
 

2000 romantic drama films
2000s Tamil-language films
2003 films
Films scored by Yuvan Shankar Raja
Indian romantic drama films